Gary Clark Jr. Live, or simply Live, is a live double album by American musician Gary Clark Jr., released by Warner Records on September 23, 2014. The tracks featured on the album were recorded over the course of an 18-month-long tour from 2013 to 2014.

Gary Clark Jr. Live was ranked  47 on Rolling Stones list of the "50 Best Albums of 2014".

Reception

AllMusic's Steve Leggett called Gary Clark Jr. Live "a wonderful introduction to a fine young guitar player, songwriter, and singer", complimenting Clark's guitar playing as well as the sound quality. David Fricke of Rolling Stone praised the album as an improvement on Clark's 2012 studio effort Blak and Blu, writing that his extended solos in Gary Clark Jr. Live "show his clear, personal spin on the more recent precedents of Jimi Hendrix and Stevie Ray Vaughan". Michael Haskoor of Diffuser.fm also praised the album, calling it "simply great from front to back. [...] Gary Clark Jr. Live is not only an album, it's an experience."

Rolling Stone ranked Gary Clark Jr. Live  47 on their list of the "50 Best Albums of 2014". In 2016, Troy L. Smith of Cleveland.com included Gary Clark Jr. Live on his list of "35 amazing live albums from the past 25 years", writing that it "showcases [Clark's] uncanny ability to ride a solo to chill-inducing levels. It also highlights his underrated falsetto."

Track listing
All tracks are written by Gary Clark Jr., except where noted.

Personnel
Adapted from the album's liner notes.

Gary Clark Jr. Band
 Gary Clark Jr.– vocals, lead guitar, harmonica
 King Zapata– guitars
 Johnny Bradley– bass guitar
 Johnny Radelat– drums

Production
 Bharath "Cheex" Ramanth– producer and recording
 Gary Clark Jr.– producer
 Rob Cavallo and Scooter Weintraub– co-producers
 Kris Krishna– associate producer
 Robert Collins– recording on "If You Love Me Like You Say" and "Please Come Home"
 Doug McKean– mixing
 Tom Rasulo– assistant engineer
 Lenny Waronker– A&R
 Brian Gardner– mastering

References

Gary Clark Jr. live albums
2014 live albums
Warner Records live albums